The 1964 Kent State Golden Flashes football team was an American football team that represented Kent State University in the Mid-American Conference (MAC) during the 1964 NCAA University Division football season. In their first season under head coach Leo Strang, the Golden Flashes compiled a 3–5–1 record (1–4–1 against MAC opponents), finished in sixth place in the MAC, and were outscored by all opponents by a combined total of 121 to 87.

The team's statistical leaders included Tom Clements with 444 rushing yards, Ron Mollric with 384 passing yards, and Fred Gissendaner with 258 receiving yards. Offensive guard Booker Collins and halfback Pat Gucciardo were selected as first-team All-MAC players.

Leo Strang was hired as Kent State's head football coach in January 1964. He head previously been the football coach at Massillon Washington High School.

Schedule

References

Kent State
Kent State Golden Flashes football seasons
Kent State Golden Flashes football